= Machadorythus =

Scientific classification
- Kingdom: Animalia
- Phylum: Arthropoda
- Clade: Pancrustacea
- Class: Insecta
- Order: Ephemeroptera
- Family: Machadorythidae
- Genus: Machadorythus; Demoulin, 1959
- Species: M. maculatus

Binomial name
- Machadorythus maculatus (Kimmins, 1949)

Synonyms
- Tricorythus maculatus Kimmins 1949; Machadorythus palanquim Demoulin, 1959

Species of African mayfly

Machadorythus maculatus, the pop-eyed mayfly, is a species of sub-Saharan African mayfly.
